Acrocercops isotoma is a moth of the family Gracillariidae. It is found in Queensland, Australia.

References

isotoma
Moths of Australia
Moths described in 1940